The 2020–21 PAOK FC season was the club's 95th season in existence and the club's 62nd consecutive season in the top flight of Greek football. In addition to the domestic league, PAOK participated in this season's editions of the Greek Cup and in the UEFA Champions League and the UEFA Europa League. The season covers the period from 20 July 2020 to 30 June 2021.

On 23 May 2021, PAOK defeated league champions Olympiacos in the Greek Cup Final to win the domestic cup for the 8th time in club history.

Coaching staff

Players

Current squad

Transfers

Players in 

As of 30 January 2021

Players Out

As of 26 March 2021

 (40% of the transfer fee to Arsenal)

 Total spending: €6,600,000

 Total income: €8,800,000

 Net income €2,200,000

Pre-season and other friendlies

Competitions

Overview

Managerial statistics

Last updated: 27 May 2021

Super League Greece

League table

Matches

Results summary

Results by round

Play-off round
The top six teams from Regular season will meet twice (10 matches per team) for places in 2021–22 UEFA Champions League and 2021–22 UEFA Europa Conference League as well as deciding the league champion.

Results summary

Results by round

Matches

Greek Football Cup

First round

Quarter-finals

Semi-finals

Final

UEFA Champions League

Qualifying round and Play-off round

Europa League

Group stage

The group stage draw was held on 2 October 2020.

Statistics

Squad statistics

! colspan="13" style="background:#DCDCDC; text-align:center" | Goalkeepers
|-

! colspan="13" style="background:#DCDCDC; text-align:center" | Defenders
|-

! colspan="13" style="background:#DCDCDC; text-align:center" | Midfielders
|-

! colspan="13" style="background:#DCDCDC; text-align:center" | Forwards
|-

! colspan="13" style="background:#DCDCDC; text-align:center" | Players transferred out during the season
|-

|}

Goalscorers

As from 22 May 2021

Clean sheets
As of 22 May 2021

Disciplinary record
As of 22 May 2021

References

External links

PAOK FC seasons
PAOK
PAOK